Jedeme, jedeme (or Jedeme, jedeme, jedeme as shown on the inner cover of the album) is the third album of the Czech band Olympic published in 1971 by Supraphon. It had a cover with multiple pages. It was the band’s first stereo album.

Songs of the album

Side A
 Pět cestujících (Petr Janda/Zdeněk Rytíř) - 5:25
 Když jsem bejval tramp (Petr Janda/Eduard Krečmar) - 2:08
 Mr. Den a lady Noc (Petr Janda/Zdeněk Rytíř) - 3:19
 Brouk (Petr Janda/Eduard Krečmar) - 4:12
 Danny (Petr Janda/Zdeněk Rytíř) - 6:07

Side B
 Elixír (Petr Janda/Zdeněk Rytíř) - 3:16
 Bláznivej Kiki (Petr Janda/Zdeněk Rytíř) - 3:35
 Bon soir mademoiselle Paris (Petr Janda/Zdeněk Rytíř) - 3:49
 Strážce majáku (Petr Janda/Zdeněk Rytíř) - 3:25
 Tobogán (Petr Janda/Zdeněk Rytíř) - 4:50

References

External links
 Rateyourmusic.com

Olympic (band) albums
1971 albums